{{Infobox gymnast
|name= Milena Baldassarri
|image=Milena Baldassarri Guadalajara 2018.jpg 
|imagesize=
|caption= Baldassarri during the European Championships in Guadalajara in 2018
|fullname= Milena Baldassarri
|altname= 
|nickname= Millie
|country=Italy  
|formercountry=
|birth_date= 
|birth_place=Ravenna, Italy
|hometown=
|residence=
|height=173cm
|weight=56kg
|discipline=RG
|level= Senior international elite
|natlteam= 2015–present
|club= Faber Ginnastica Fabriano 
|gym= Kori kori
|collegeteam=
|headcoach= Kristina Ghiurova
|assistcoach= Julieta Cantaluppi
|formercoach= 
|choreographer= Bilyana Dyakova
|music= 
|eponymousskills=
|worldranking= 2 WC (2022 Season) 
 7 WCC (2019 Season) 
| show-medals = yes
| medaltemplates =

 

 |Palmarès=}}

Milena Baldassarri (born 16 October 2001 in Ravenna, Italy) is an Italian individual rhythmic gymnast. She won the silver medal at the World Championship at the 2018 Rhythmic Gymnastics World Championships. She competed at the 2020 Summer Olympics, in Individual all around.

Baldassarri was already a bronze medalist at the 2016 European Junior Championships. On the National level, she is a three-time (2018, 2020, 2021) Italian National All-around champion, 2019-2022 Italian National All-around silver medalist, 2017 Italian National All-around bronze medalist, and 2016 Italian Junior National All-around champion.

 Career 
 Junior 
Baldassarri started practising rhythmic gymnastics in Ravenna. In 2014 she moved to Fabriano, and started being trained by the olympian Julieta Cantaluppi and her mother, Bulgarian rhythmic gymnast Kristina Guiourova. In 2015 she was selected in the Italian national junior group to compete at the 2015 Rhythmic Gymnastics European Championships in Minsk, Belarus. They placed 6th in Group All-around and 5th in 5 Balls final. At the 2016 European Junior Championships Baldassarri won team bronze with Alexandra Agiurgiuculese.

 Senior 
In 2017 Season, Baldassarri made her senior international debut at the International tournament " Città Pesaro, where she managed to win the bronze medal in the All-around, silver at the ribbon final and gold at the club's final, ahead of Russian Ekaterina Selezneva. In May 2017 she competed at 2017 Sofia World Cup, her first world cup, where she took the 10th place in the AA,. On 19–21 May, Baldassarri, along with teammates Alexandra Agiurgiuculese and Alessia Russo represented the individual seniors for Italy at the 2017 European Championships, where she qualified in the ribbon finals finishing in 7th place.
On 5–7 August Baldassarri finished 8th in the all-around at the 2017 Minsk World Challenge Cup, she qualified in 2 apparatus finals and finished 7th in ribbon and 4th in ball, with the same score of the 3rd (16.650). Unfortunately, the tie is broken in favour of her teammate Alexandra Agiurgiuculese who received the bronze medal.

Together with Alexandra Agiurgiuculese, Baldassarri represented Italy at the 2017 World Rhythmic Gymnastics Championships in Pesaro, where she finished 9th in the All-around ahead of Bulgaria's Katrin Taseva; she also qualified for the ribbon final where she finished in 6th position. She was awarded with Alina Kabaeva Prize.

2018
In 2018 Season, on 30 March - 1 April, Baldassarri began the world cup events competing at the 2018 Sofia World Cup finishing 12th in the all-around, she qualified in hoop finals, finishing 5th. On 13–15 April Baldassarri competed at the 2018 Pesaro World Cup finishing 9th in the all-around, she qualified in the ribbon final. On 27–29 April she then competed in the event at the 2018 Baku World Cup where she won finished 8th in the all-around behind Japan's Kaho Minagawa, she then qualified in 1 event final. On 4–6 May she competed at the 2018 Guadalajara World Challenge Cup where she had a new highest rank all-around placement finishing 4th in the all-around behind Russia's Arina Averina, Baldassarri had an overall successful event qualifying in all apparatus finals, she won her first world cup medal a silver in ball behind Linoy Ashram, she also won a bronze in clubs, finished 5th with ribbon and hoop. On 16–17 May Baldassarri competed at the 2018 Holon Grand Prix finishing 7th in the all-around behind Salome Pazhava, she qualified in 2 apparatus finals where she won her first Grand Prix gold medal in ribbon, she also won bronze in ball.

Again with Alexandra Agiurgiuculese, Baldassarri represented Italy at the 2018 Rhythmic Gymnastics World Championships in Sofia. She won the silver medal at the ribbon apparatus, becoming at 16 years old the first individual Italian gymnast who ever won an apparatus silver medal in the World Championship.

2019
Baldassarri competed at the 2019 World Challenge Cup Minsk where she won the bronze medal in the Ribbon final . Baldassarri competed at the 2019 World Challenge Cup Portimao where she won the silver medal in the All-around competition. She also won a gold medal in the ball and ribbon final, and a silver medal in the Clubs final. Baldassarri represented Italy together with Alexandra Agiurgiuculese, Alessia Russo and Sofia Maffeis at the  2019 World Championships in Baku, Azerbaijan, who placed 4th in Team competition. Baldassarri placed 4th in Ball final and 8th in Ribbon final. In All-around Final, she ended on 7th place and secured Italy an Olympic spot for the 2020 Summer Olympics in Tokyo, Japan.

2021
Baldassarri and Agiurgiuculese also represented Italy at the Tokyo 2020 Olympics. While Agiurgiuculese could not make it to the finals, Milena Baldassarri qualified 6th, and confirmed the same position during the finals, an historical record for Italian gymnastics.

Baldassarri was selected to represent Italy at the 2021 World Championships in Kitakyushu, Japan where she won a silver medal in the team competition, together with Sofia Raffaeli, Alexandra Agiurgiuculese, and the Italian group.

2022
In the 2022 season, Baldassarri, competed at the 2022 Sofia World Cup where she won a bronze medal in the ball final.
On 22-24 April Baldassarri competed at the 2022 World Cup Baku where she won the bronze medal in the all-around competition behind of teammate Sofia Raffaeli and Boryana Kaleyn. She also won a silver medal with ball. 
On 27-29 May Baldassarri competed at the 2022 Italian National Championships where she won the silver medal in the all-around competition and she also managed to win four silver medals in the apparatus finals.
On 3-5 June Baldassarri competed at the 2022 World Cup Pesaro where she won the silver medal in the all around competition.
From 15 to 19 June Baldassarri competed at the 2022 European Championships in Tel Aviv, Israel where she won a silver medal in the team competition, together with Sofia Raffaeli and the Italian group.
On 28 August Baldassarri competed at the 2022 World Challenge Cup Cluj-Napoca where she won a bronze medal in the ball final.
From 14 to 18 September Baldassarri represented Italy at the World Championships in Sofia, Bulgaria, where she won a bronze medal in the 
ball final and a gold medal in the team competition.

2023

 Achievements 
 First Italian individual rhythmic gymnast to win a silver medal at the World Championships.
 First, and only, Italian individual rhythmic gymnast to place 6th in the All Around final at the Tokyo 2020 Olympics.

Routine music information 

 Competitive highlights (Team competitions in seniors are held only at the World Championships, Europeans and other Continental Games.)''

Detailed Olympic results

References

External links
 
 

Italian rhythmic gymnasts
2001 births
Living people
Sportspeople from Ravenna
Mediterranean Games bronze medalists for Italy
Mediterranean Games medalists in gymnastics
Competitors at the 2018 Mediterranean Games
Gymnasts at the 2020 Summer Olympics
Olympic gymnasts of Italy
Competitors at the 2022 World Games